For the Last Time: Live From the Astrodome is the first live album released by George Strait in February 11, 2003.  The title refers to the fact that this concert was the final event that took place at the Houston Astrodome.

Strait's performance of "She'll Leave You with a Smile" was used as a promotional clip to promote the album.

Track listing

Personnel
Mike Daily – steel guitar
Gene Elders – fiddle
Terry Hale – bass guitar
Wes Hightower – background vocals
Ronnie Huckaby – keyboards
Mike Kennedy – drums
Joe Manuel – acoustic guitar
Benny McArthur – electric guitar, fiddle
Rick McRae – electric guitar
Marty Slayton – background vocals
Jeff Sterms – keyboards
George Strait – lead vocals, acoustic guitar

Charts

Weekly charts

Year-end charts

Certifications

References

Albums produced by Tony Brown (record producer)
2003 live albums
George Strait live albums
MCA Records live albums